This is a list of people from Constanța, Romania.

Haig Acterian (1904–1943), theatre director, journalist and fascist activist
Horia Agarici (1911–1982), World War II flying ace
Simona Amânar (b. 1979), Olympic gold medal-winning gymnast
Elena Băsescu (b. 1980), Member of the European Parliament
Răzvan Florea (b. 1980), Olympic bronze medal-winning swimmer
Nicholas Georgescu-Roegen (1906–1994), mathematician
Simona Halep (b. 1991), tennis player
Puiu Hașotti (b. 1953), MP and senator
Ramona Mănescu (b. 1972), Member of the European Parliament
Vasile Moldoveanu (b. 1935), operatic tenor
Nicolae Nemirschi (b. 1959), Environment Minister (2008–2009)
Aihan Omer (b. 1960), handball player and coach
Andrei Pavel (b. 1974), tennis player
Cătălina Ponor (b. 1987), Olympic gold medal-winning gymnast
Mitică Pricop (b. 1977) Olympic gold medal-winning canoeist
Marianna Radev (1913–1973), operatic contralto
Alexandra Sidorovici (1906–2000), communist politician
Anastasia Soare (born 1957/58), American billionaire businesswoman
Alexandra Stan (b. 1989), singer and model
Sebastian Stan (b. 1982), actor
Dan Stoenescu (b. 1980), diplomat, political scientist and journalist
Nicoleta Daniela Șofronie (b. 1988), Olympic gold medal-winning gymnast
Harry Tavitian (b. 1952), jazz pianist and singer

 
Constanta